Zapolye is a rural locality (a village) in Verkh-Invenskoye Rural Settlement, Kudymkarsky District, Perm Krai, Russia. The population was 47 as of 2010.

Geography 
It is located 44 km west from Kudymkar.

References 

Rural localities in Kudymkarsky District